Ballymartle railway station was on the Cork and Kinsale Junction Railway in County Cork, Ireland.

History
The station opened on 1 April 1864.

Regular passenger services were withdrawn on 31 August 1931.

References

Further reading 
 

Disused railway stations in County Cork
Railway stations opened in 1864
Railway stations closed in 1931